Jigni State was a princely state of the Bundelkhand Agency of the British Raj. 
It was a small Sanad state of about 82.87 km2 with a population of 4,297 inhabitants in 1901. The state was surrounded by the Hamirpur and Jhansi districts of the United Provinces.

Its capital was at Jigni, also known as Jigini. It is a small town —1,770 inhabitants in 1901— located near the confluence of the Dhasan and the Betwa River in present-day Rath tehsil of Hamirpur district, Uttar Pradesh.

History
Jigni State was founded as a jagir in 1730 by Rao Padam Singh, a Rajput of the Bundela clan. He was a son of Chhatrasal, the founder of Panna State. Originally the jagir had been larger, but its size was much reduced during the Maratha invasion in the last half of the eighteenth century.

Jigni became a British protectorate in 1810 under the rule of Pirthi Singh.
Rao Bhupendra Vijai Singh, the last ruler of Jigni State signed the instrument of accession to India in 1947, the state becoming part of the Indian Union on 1 January 1950.

Rulers
The ruling family were members of the Bundela clan of Rajputs. The rulers used the title of Rao.

Title Rao

See also
Political integration of India
Vindhya Pradesh

References

External links
Jigni – Indian Rajputs

Princely states of India
Hamirpur district, Uttar Pradesh
Rajputs
1730 establishments in India
1950 disestablishments in India